Mikuláš Jozef Lexmann, OP (October 28, 1899 – July 17, 1952) was a Slovak Catholic priest, one of the most important figures of the Dominican Order in Slovakia. He was a very active man of wide interests, a pioneer of driving and a pilot. During World War II, he was hiding people in danger of their life in the crypt of the Dominican Church in Košice, and is thus registered among those who rescued Jews at the Holocaust Memorial Center in Budapest. At the beginning of the 1950s, he was interned by the communist government in several monasteries, where harsh living conditions deteriorated his health and hastened his death.

He belongs to the martyrs of the Dominican Order of the 20th century. In 2013, the Slovak province of the Order approved to initiate a process of his beatification.

Early life
Jozef Lexmann was born as the first of eight children to a family in which the father was a craftsman and the mother had a drapery business. His mother was very pious, and a lay Dominican. Four of her children eventually chose religious life: besides Joseph, his brother Gregor and sister Mary joined the Dominicans, and sister Brigita became a member of the Congregation of Teaching Sisters of Notre Dame.

Jozef went to the elementary school in Bobot, then he continued at the school in Bánovce nad Bebravou. He then joined the Dominican juvenate. From 1912 to 1916, he studied at a grammar school in Budapest. As a seventeen-year-old, he entered the Dominican Order in Graz and adopted the religious name Mikuláš (Nicholas). He finished his novitiate and graduated in philosophy and theology in Graz and Vienna. He received priestly ordination on July 29, 1923. The following year he began to work in the Dominican priory in Košice. On July 4, 1933, he became its superior.

The first “flying monk”
In addition to all his duties, Mikuláš Lexmann was very much interested in technical innovations. In Košice he became the first priest to hold a driving license and already in the 1920s he used to drive there. Using a rental car, he ran a driving course for the unemployed and the poor. He was an executive director of the Autoclub for Eastern Slovakia. He also completed a pilot course in 1935, becoming the first priest-pilot in Czechoslovakia. He dropped a wreath of flowers from his plane in front of the Dominican church in Kosice for his brother Rafael's first Holy Mass. He was also Mayor of the Orol (a Christian Sports Association) and he founded the Veritas Cultural Center in the city. Photography and filming were among his hobbies.

In 1936 he was assigned by his superiors to Znojmo. He enrolled at Masaryk University in Brno. From 1937 he continued his studies at Charles University in Prague. However, he did not finish his studies due to the threat of being arrested by the Gestapo. Therefore, he fled to a monastery in Sopron, then he was assigned to Vasvar.

Saving lives
In 1944 he returned to Košice. At the turn of 1944-45, in the crypt of the Dominican Church, he hid about twenty people from the terror of the Arrow Cross Party, and probably saved their lives. He is thus registered at the Holocaust Memorial Center in Budapest as one of those who rescued the Jews during the War. In 1946 he founded the Holy Rosary magazine in Košice. He also learned Esperanto and organized its courses. In 1948 he participated in organizing a congress of Slovak Esperanto students in Košice. In addition, he worked there as a monastery librarian, catechist or preacher of retreats.

Interrogations and internment
Mikuláš Lexmann experienced his first interrogation at the Košice headquarters of the StB (Secret Service) in December 1947. On February 20, 1948, he was arrested for a month due to his contacts with Julius Patúc, accused of establishing an illegal organization Slovak National League, directed against communism. M. Lexmann was also mentioned in the investigation of the activities of Rodina (the Family, a spiritual movement), founded by Croatian priest Tomislav Kolaković. Despite StB's pressure, on June 17, 1949, he read during a Holy Mass a pastoral letter written by the secret bishops' conference in Prague.

In April 1950 he was arrested and transported from Košice during the Akcia K (Action K, an apprehension of all religious in Czechoslovakia) and then transferred to internment monasteries in Pezinok, Báč and Podolínec. On November 29, 1950, he was considered officially as a "reactionary and incorrigible" religious and transferred to the monastery in Králíky. In the internment monasteries, living conditions were generally very harsh. In Králíky M. Lexmann had already serious heart problems, high blood pressure and walked with a cane. Lack of drugs and hard work worsened his health. On one hot July day he was sent to graze a cow. The sun and walking up a steep hill exhausted him completely.

He died on July 17, 1952, at the age of 52, probably due to a stroke. He was buried in his native village of Bobot. Mikuláš Jozef Lexmann was included on the international list of Dominican martyrs of the 20th century. In 2013, the Slovak province of Dominicans approved the initiation of the process of his beatification.

References

Further reading
 Lagová, Veronika, a kol. Smrť za mrežami. Vydavateľstvo Michal Vaško. 2008.

1899 births
1952 deaths
Members of the Dominican Order
Slovak Roman Catholic priests
Slovak Esperantists
Czechoslovak Roman Catholic priests
Charles University alumni